The Shadow DN6 was a race car designed and built by Shadow Racing Cars for Formula 5000 racing in 1975, and competed until 1976, when the SCCA Continental Championship dissolved. It was driven by Jackie Oliver, who only managed to win one race with it, at Road America in 1976. The DN6, was powered by both a 5.0-liter Chevrolet V8 engine, but also later used a Dodge  small-block engine.

References

Formula 5000 cars
DN6